Kouta Bouya is a town in the western Dikhil region of Djibouti.

Overview
The village was originally built on the plain of Gobaad, with houses constructed of mud and stone. Most of the inhabitants earned their living through animal husbandry and commerce, and used a well for drinking water.
Nearby towns and villages include As Eyla (15 km), Lake Abbe (24 km) and Dikhil (53 km).

External links
Satellite map at Maplandia.com

Populated places in Djibouti